Jon Tucker  is a Canadian screenwriter, filmmaker, and journalist who was named "Best Local Filmmaker" by the Montreal Mirror in 2000. Tucker is a graduate of the Canadian Film Centre, produced plays for the Montreal Fringe Festival, performed script coverage for Movie Central, and was co-screenwriter for the Showcase situation-comedy The Foundation.

Tucker has also written book and film reviews for the Montreal Mirror, Hour and Vice. In 2012, Tucker published his debut novel, Putz of the Century with Fast Hands Press.

Since 2004, Tucker has made regular appearances on CBC Radio One's comedy program WireTap.

References

External links
 Fast Hands Press

Living people
Anglophone Quebec people
Canadian radio personalities
Canadian television writers
Film directors from Montreal
Canadian Film Centre alumni
Writers from Montreal
Year of birth missing (living people)